Johnny Skidmarks is a 1998 mystery thriller film directed by John Raffo.

Synopsis

Crime scene photographer, Johnny Scardino (aka Johnny Skidmarks), is working on the side for a group of blackmailers, photographing wealthy guys in seedy motels with prostitutes. One such assignment turns the wrong way and the blackmailers he works for start dying one by one in more and more brutal ways. Is Johnny the next on the list?

Cast
 Peter Gallagher as Johnny Scardino
 Frances McDormand as Alice
 John Lithgow as Sergeant Larry Skovik
 John Kapelos as Walter Lippinscott
 Jack Black as Jerry
 Charlie Spradling as Lorraine

References

External links
 
 

1998 films
1998 crime thriller films
1990s mystery films
American mystery films
1990s English-language films
1990s American films